The Turuchan pika (Ochotona turuchanensis) is a species of pika found in isolated regions in the Central Siberian Plateau. It is a small (16–19 cm) rock dwelling species that is active during the day due to the low temperature at night. It was previously thought to be a subspecies of the Northern pika. Little is known about this species, but is known to be locally abundant.

Distribution
The Turuchan pika occurs from the southern reach of the Yenisei River to Lake Baikal to the middle region of the Lena River. On the Primorsky Mountain Ridge in the Irkutsk Region, 14 localities were surveyed for pika occurrence in June 2018 and July 2019. All areas were considered to be within the Northern pika's range of distribution. However, it was discovered through in-situ pika vocalizations that only the Turuchan pika was present there.

Haying Behavior 
On the Primorsky Ridge, in the talus surrounded by taiga, researchers investigated the diversity and abundance of plant species found in the Turuchan pika habitat and the pika's haypiles. The pika was found to be selective in its food collection, and due to their relative rarity in the environment, Veratrum nigrum and Urtica dioica were highly prized and abundant within the hay-piles.

References

 Borisova, Nikulin, A. A., Nikulina, N. A., Popov, S. V., Starkov, A. I., & Lenkhoboeva, S. Yu. (2022). Findings of the Turukhan pika (Ochotona turuchanensis Naumov 1934) on the Primorsky Range (Irkutsk Region). Zoologicheskiĭ Zhurnal., 101(1), 94–100. https://doi.org/10.31857/S0044513422010020

 Lenkhoboeva, S. Y., Chepinoga, V. V., Borisova, N. G., Chimitov, D. G., Belova, V. A., Skornyakova, A. M., Nikulin, A. A., Nikulina, N. A., & Ilchenko, O. G. (2021). The composition of haypiles of Turuchan pika (Preliminary analysis). IOP Conference Series: Earth and Environmental Science, 908(1), 012019. https://doi.org/10.1088/1755-1315/908/1/012019

Further reading
 

Pikas
Mammals described in 1934